The 2012 City of Lincoln Council election took place on 3 May 2012 to elect one-third of the members of City of Lincoln Council in Lincolnshire, England, for a 4-year term of office. This was on the same day as other 2012 United Kingdom local elections.

All locally registered electors (British, Irish, Commonwealth and European Union citizens) who were aged 18 or over on Thursday 2 May 2012 were entitled to vote in the local elections. Those who were temporarily away from their ordinary address (for example, away working, on holiday, in student accommodation or in hospital) were also entitled to vote in the local elections, although those who had moved abroad and registered as overseas electors cannot vote in the local elections. It is possible to register to vote at more than one address (such as a university student who had a term-time address and lives at home during holidays) at the discretion of the local Electoral Register Office, but it remains an offence to vote more than once in the same local government election.

Summary
The Labour Party retained overall control of the council with an increased majority, gaining 7 seats from the Conservatives who retained a single contested seat. No other party won any seats and the Liberal Democrats were out-polled by the UKIP and lost their sole councillor. After the election the party representation was Labour Party 24 and Conservative Party (UK) 8; Others 1.

From the comments of the party leaders, it appears that significant numbers of Conservative voters withheld their support and the Conservatives also blamed the intervention of UKIP candidates.

Candidates
Labour and Conservative candidates contested every ward.

Election results

|-
| colspan=2 style="text-align: right; margin-right: 1em" | Total
| style="text-align: right;" | 11
| colspan=5 |
| style="text-align: right;" | 17,457
| style="text-align: right;" | 

All comparisons in vote share are to the corresponding 2008 election.

Ward results

Abbey

Birchwood

Boultham

Bracebridge

Carholme

Castle

Glebe

Hartsholme

Minster

Moorland

Park

By-elections between 2012 and 2014

References

2012 English local elections
2012
2010s in Lincolnshire